Cambodia Asia Bank (CAB) Bank commenced its operations in Cambodia on February 23, 1993 with the opening of commercial banking at the heart of Phnom Penh City. is a  LLC bank of Cambodia, based in Phnom Penh and operating over a dozen branch offices. CAB offers loan, savings account, foreign remittance and other financial services.

References

External links 
Cambodia Asia Bank
Cambodia Asia Bank at the Cambodia Yellow Pages
Cambodia Asia Bank at the site of the Trade Promotion Board of the Ministry of Commerce

Banks of Cambodia
Companies based in Phnom Penh